Conocephalum supradecompositum is a species of thalloid liverwort in the genus Conocephalum, of the order Marchantiales and the family Conocephalaceae. C. supradecompositum has a distribution that is mainly restricted to China and Japan. C. supradecompositum has very distinct chemical composition from the species Conocephalum conicum.

Habitat and distribution 
Conocephalum supradecompositum is mainly restricted to China and Japan.

Morphology 
Conocephalum supradecompositum is relatively small in size, compared to C. conicum, with a thallus roughly 2-3 cm long.

Chemical composition 
Conocephalum supradecompositum has very distinct chemical composition from the species C. conicum. Monoterpenoid content in C. supradecompositum is much less than that of C. conicum.

See also 
 Bryophyte
 Marchantiophyta
 Marchantiales
 Conocephalum
 Conocephalum conicum
 Conocephalum salebrosum

References 

Marchantiales
Flora of Asia